The 1997 Lafayette Leopards football team was an American football team that represented Lafayette College during the 1997 NCAA Division I-AA football season. Lafayette finished tied for second-to-last in the Patriot League.

In their 17th year under head coach Bill Russo, the Leopards compiled a 3–8 record. Dan Bengele, Craig Hansen and Todd Stahlnecker were the team captains.

The Leopards were outscored 314 to 236. Lafayette's 2–4 conference record placed it in a three-way tie for fourth in the seven-team Patriot League standings.

Lafayette played its home games at Fisher Field on College Hill in Easton, Pennsylvania.

Schedule

References

Lafayette
Lafayette Leopards football seasons
Lafayette Leopards football